Celestial Heights is a private housing estate on Quarry Hill in Kowloon, Hong Kong, jointly developed by Cheung Kong Holdings and Nan Fung Group near To Kwa Wan station. There are 939 housing units, with an average price of HK$19,000,000. It is composed of several more-than-50-floor buildings. It was completed in 2009 and 2010.

History
In 2004, Cheung Kong Holdings succeeded to pay HK$9.4 billion for the land of the former Ho Man Tin Police Married Quarters during an auction. This price was the second highest record in Hong Kong property history after Sino Land paid HK$11.8 billion for the land in Siu Sai Wan, later Island Resort, in 1997.

Features
The shopping arcade of Celestial Heights could only be accessed on Kau Pui Lung Road, which is very distant from the address listed.

Education
Celestial Heights is in Primary One Admission (POA) School Net 34. Within the school net are multiple aided schools (operated independently but funded with government money) and two government schools: Farm Road Government Primary School (農圃道官立小學) and Ma Tau Chung Government Primary School (馬頭涌官立小學).

References

i-CABLE︰長實半山壹號4個廁所3個漏水
Apple Daily: 富甲半山首日僅賣40伙

External links

 

CK Hutchison Holdings
Private housing estates in Hong Kong
Nan Fung Group